Wallamba River, a watercourse of the Mid-Coast Council system, is located in the Mid North Coast district of New South Wales, Australia.

Course and features
Wallamba River rises on the northern slopes of Kyle Range, near the locality of Gangat. The river flows generally east and then south, joined by five minor tributaries, before reaching its confluence with the Coolongolook River at Wallis Lake; descending  over its  course.

The river is transversed by the Pacific Highway south of Nabiac.

At one stage, a riverboat milk pick up service operated for the dairy farmers who farmed along the banks of the river. This service was discontinued in the mid-1970s due to economic reasons. Road milk tankers were then used to pick up from the farms.

Water skiing and fishing is popular along the Wallamba.

See also 

 Rivers of New South Wales
 List of rivers in New South Wales (L-Z)
 List of rivers of Australia

References

External links
 

Rivers of New South Wales
Mid-Coast Council
Mid North Coast